Yulian Vasilievich Popovich (born June 15, 1990) is a Kazakhstani professional ice hockey forward who plays with Barys Astana in the Kontinental Hockey League (KHL).

References

External links 

1990 births
Living people
Barys Nur-Sultan players
Gornyak Rudny players
Kazakhstani ice hockey forwards
Nomad Astana players
People from Kostanay Region
Snezhnye Barsy players
Universiade medalists in ice hockey
Universiade silver medalists for Kazakhstan
Competitors at the 2015 Winter Universiade